The New Democratic Party of Quebec fielded ninety candidates in the 1985 Quebec provincial election, none of whom were elected. Information about these candidates may be found on this page.

Electoral divisions
(n.c.: no candidate)

References

1985